The Cutting Room Floor is a compilation album of outtakes, demos and live tracks by Over the Rhine, intended as a companion disc to 2001's Films For Radio.  The album was released independently and sold only at concerts and on Over The Rhine's website.

Track listing
All songs by Linford Detweiler and Karin Bergquist unless otherwise noted.

"Spinning" - 2:48
"Toledo" - 4:24
"If Nothing Else (Beatbox Mix)" (Detweiler) - 4:55
"Toledo (instrumental)" - 4:38
"Green-Clouded Swallowtail (Version 1.0)" (Bergquist) - 5:52
"I Let It Go" - 5:31
"Give Me Strength (acoustic)" (Dido Armstrong, Pascal Gabriel, Paul Statham) - 4:27
"I Radio Heaven (original demo)" (Detweiler) - 4:34
"Goodbye Strings" (Detweiler) -  0:49
"Fairpoint Diary (original demo)" (Detweiler) - 4:46
"It's Never Quite What It Seems (Nashville)" - 4:16
"Happy And Free" (Bergquist) - 3:48
"Helpless (live)" (Neil Young) (live at the Taft Theatre, December 7, 2001) - 5:42

Personnel

Karin Bergquist - Vocals, Piano, Acoustic Guitar
Linford Detweiler - Keyboards, harmonium, Hammond B-3, guitars, bass, wurlitzer, piano, harmony vocal on #5

Additional personnel
Jack Henderson - Electric guitars, lap steel, harmonica
Byron House - bass
Don Heffington - drums
Mickey Raphael - harmonica on #4
Norm Johns - cello on #8 and #10
David Davidson (violin), Kristin Wilkinson (viola), John Catchings (cello) - strings on #9
Tony Paoletta: pedal steel on #11
Buddy Miller, Julie Miller, Kim Taylor, Erin McKeown - vocals on #13
Wade Jaynes - bass on #13
Dale Baker - drums on #13
Buddy Miller - mando-guitar on #13

Over the Rhine (band) albums
2002 albums